Little Inferno is a puzzle video game developed and published by American independent game developer Tomorrow Corporation. The game was released for the Wii U in November 2012 in North America, Europe and Australasia. Microsoft Windows, iOS, OS X, Linux and Android versions followed throughout 2013. A Nintendo Switch version was released in March 2017 in North America, Europe and Australia.

Little Inferno is set in front of a brick fireplace, which the player uses to set various objects, such as toys, dolls, and electronics, on fire. The game encourages the player to burn any combination of objects to see how they react when lit ablaze, as most of the objects have unique properties. Little Inferno is classified as a sandbox game as it offers few traditional objectives to complete and has no states of failure. The game was designed as a satire of similarly themed video games in which the player dedicates long amounts of time to performing tasks considered to be unrewarding.

Little Inferno garnered widely varied reactions upon its release. Some reviewers praised the unique gameplay concepts and satirical narrative, while others believed the gameplay was too simplistic.

Gameplay

Little Inferno is a sandbox-oriented puzzle video game primarily viewed from a first-person perspective. The player assumes the role of a small, largely unseen character who possesses the fictional "Little Inferno Entertainment Fireplace", which they use to incinerate various objects, such as toys and appliances, to keep warm (necessary due to a seemingly unending drop in the game world's temperature). The objects release money when they are burned, which is used to purchase more burnable objects from mail order catalogs. In order to progress the narrative, the player must burn the newest objects available to them, unlocking new catalogs and expanding the selection of (more expensive) objects. There is no scoring system, nor are there any penalties or time limits imposed on the player, allowing them to freely experiment with burning any combination of objects. The game uses a drag and drop interface to position and ignite the objects. The PC versions are controlled using a mouse, while the Wii U version can be controlled with the Wii Remote pointer or with the Wii U GamePad's touchscreen, which also allows for Off-TV Play.

Many of the game's available objects possess special properties that may influence the other objects in the fireplace. For example, frozen objects such as dry ice cause others to freeze and easily shatter, and objects with strong gravitational pull move or attract all other objects. When set on fire, many objects react by activating, exploding, or changing the properties of the flames. All objects automatically vanish from the fireplace upon being reduced to ash.

Little Inferno offers the player several goals to achieve. The player can trigger "Combos" when two or three specific objects are burned simultaneously. The player is presented with a list of the game's 99 possible Combos; the names of the Combos hint the relationship of the required objects, and it is up to the player to determine the correct objects to burn. By burning new Combos, the player can earn stamps which speed up shipping new objects, along with a small amount of bonus money.

Story
Little Infernos story is primarily told through letters received from various non-playable characters. The game is set in the city of Burnington where the weather is constantly snowy and freezing. The Tomorrow Corporation, a self-reference to the game's developer, is a company whose headquarters is located on the outskirts of the city and produces a product called the "Little Inferno Entertainment Fireplace", which is advertised as a means to keep warm in the freezing temperature.

The unnamed player character is mostly sent letters from a little girl, Sugar Plumps, who turns out to be the character's neighbor and has a Little Inferno Entertainment Fireplace of her own. She is usually slightly crazy but is excitable and bubbly, but as the character goes on she turns into a bit of a pyromaniac and takes on a slightly more disturbing persona.

The Weather Man, "over the smoke stacks, over the city" in his balloon, continues to report on the dreary state of the weather as the game progresses, and calls out several major events as he sees them.

Sugar Plumps begins requesting certain items relatively early in her association with the player character; these can be sent using the simple drag-and-drop interface. Later on, she sends gifts of her own (fireproof drapes for decoration, miscellaneous items to be burned).

Sugar Plumps' house burns down, and she reveals that she apparently set her house on fire on purpose. Shortly after this, the player continues to receive letters from an unnamed character who resembles Sugar Plumps.

The apparition eventually tells the player character it is time to escape by burning down their house by burning the four items that had been sent to Sugar Plumps throughout the course of the game. As the character burns the four items (fireflies, a magnet, a toy exterminator, and a pair of sunglasses) the house begins to shake and the items catch on fire and a new combo appears called the ERRRROR ERR@R ER*#^%R COMBo. The banks showing the money and stamps break and begin spewing money and stamps before the house finally explodes and launches the little character out of the house.

Gameplay now takes the form of a side-scrolling graphical adventure, and the player character (now seen for the first time) can walk around Burnington, conversing with certain people including the postman who was responsible for delivering the items the player character ordered. He gives the player character a letter which indicates that Sugar Plumps did escape her house after it burned, and is now on a beach somewhere.

The player character reaches the gates of Tomorrow Corporation, who manufactured the Little Inferno Entertainment Fireplaces, and gets to meet the CEO, Miss Nancy, who had also been sending letters. Nancy reveals that it was her plan all along to escape from the doomed city, and world, with a rocket ship, and does so, optionally giving the player character a hug if he had kept a specific item from earlier on.

Exiting Tomorrow Corporation, the player character encounters the Weather Man in his balloon, who offers to take the player character for a ride. The game ends as the two soar endlessly over the frozen wastes, the sun shining through.

Development
Little Inferno is the first game developed by Tomorrow Corporation, an independent game developer founded in 2010 consisting of three people: Kyle Gray, Kyle Gabler, and Allan Blomquist. Gray previously worked on Henry Hatsworth in the Puzzling Adventure, while Gabler and Blomquist worked on World of Goo. Gabler stated that Little Inferno was inspired by The Yule Log, a television program that consists of a 17-second loop of a burning log. The team had mused that the program was like "a super boring game that some awful company will totally make for the Wii or smartphones", which then inspired the proposal that "WE could be that awful company! But I wonder if we can start with an exceptionally underwhelming premise, but then actually make the game really really surprisingly good?" One of the goals in designing Little Inferno was to make the game "unpredictable" in order to distinguish it from existing games in which the player might easily determine the direction of the gameplay. Gabler remarked "I want to be taken on a ride, and not know where I'm going. I want game designers to respect me enough to NOT let me know exactly what's going on. Give me hints. Let me NOT know. Let me figure it out. Totally change the game out from under me."

Little Inferno was announced to be in development in August 2010. Few details were given about the game until June 2012, when development was nearly complete. Tomorrow Corporation received help from volunteer fan translators to make the game available in the English, French, German, Dutch, and Spanish languages. Nintendo assisted in localizing the title into Japanese.

Little Inferno was a launch game for the Wii U console in North America, Europe, and Australia. The North American version was released November 18, 2012, and the European and Australian versions were released later on November 30. Nintendo later published  in Japan on April 2, 2015, originally as a Wii U exclusive.

The Windows version was also released on November 18. Mac OS X and Linux versions were released in 2013 on April 15 and May 23, respectively.

The iOS version was released to the App Store on February 1, 2013.

The Android version was released to Google Play on December 3, 2013. Little Inferno was also part of the Humble Bundle: PC and Android 8, which was launched on December 17, 2013.

The game was released for the Nintendo Switch during its launch period. It was released on March 16, 2017 in North America, and on March 23, 2017 in the PAL region. It was later released for the platform on June 1, 2017 in Japan, courtesy of publisher Flyhigh Works.

After a lack of updates in 5 years, Tomorrow Corporation announced a Christmas-themed expansion named Ho Ho Holiday Expansion, which would be released for the PC ports of the game on November 18, 2022 and later for the other versions.

Music
Kyle Gabler composed the soundtrack for Little Inferno. Unlike World of Goo, whose musical themes were recycled from previous projects, Gabler wrote Little Infernos score from scratch, using the works of John Williams, Danny Elfman, and Vangelis for inspiration, which have "strong melodic themes and instantly identifiable orchestration." Gabler used REAPER to compose all the game's music, with some synthesized instruments used from a personal collection of SoundFont2 files.

Knowing that Little Inferno is a "difficult game to describe", one of the songs, "Little Inferno, Just For Me," was written to describe the game's premise in the form of a jingle. The jingle is used in-game in a fictional advertisement for the Little Inferno Entertainment Fireplace, which itself is featured in promotional trailers for the title. Travis Hill, illustrator and friend of Kyle Gray, voiced the narrator featured in the song.

Shortly after the game's release, Gabler released the soundtrack for free on Tomorrow Corporation's website.

Reception

Little Inferno received mixed reviews. Metacritic reports aggregate scores for the PC, Wii U and Nintendo Switch versions as 68/100 (based on 17 reviews), 79/100 (based on 22 reviews), and 71/100 (based on 13 reviews), respectively.

Stephen Totilo of Kotaku praised the game, saying "The test I want a good game to pass is simple: I want it to stick with me. I want it to seep into my thoughts days after I played it. Little Inferno is simple. It's somehow both quaint and bold. It lingers. It burns brightly. It burns well." Tyler Ohlew of Nintendo World Report regarded Little Inferno as "something entirely new" that "requires you to come at it with an imagination, and the ability to experiment." Ohlew awarded the game 9 out of 10, feeling that its lack of a traditional structure doesn't stop the game from being fun and stating it "is terrific the way it is, and doesn't need to conform just to fit inside a box."

Many reviewers of both the PC and Wii U versions thought the game was overpriced for the gameplay it offered, which was regarded by some as repetitive and simple. Some particular gameplay aspects were criticized, particularly the waiting time imposed on the player between purchasing an object and then receiving it, which ranges between a few seconds to a couple of minutes in real time. Garrett Martin of Joystiq regarded the controversial gameplay elements as intentional commentary, noting "even though it willfully and intentionally wastes your time, it's not a waste of time itself. The creepy atmosphere, the single-minded focus on extremely minimal actions, and the mocking self-awareness all contribute to a deft statement on games and how we play them." Edge also acknowledged the satire but stated "there's a joke being played... and we're not quite sure who's the butt of it."

Anthony Gallegos of IGN was particularly critical of the game and gave the PC version 5 out of 10. Gallegos regarded the game's story as "vague" and the puzzles as "uninspired," commenting that the "vast majority of [the Combo puzzles] are too obvious and the ones that use clever word play and require experimentation are too few." Gallegos criticized several game mechanics he believed were "unnecessary constraints", such as requiring money to obtain new objects and the limited space given for recently purchased objects. He ultimately felt that "Little Inferno'''s few great ideas fall apart like so much ash." Lucas M. Thomas of IGN, who scored the Wii U version 6.5 out of 10, expressed that the game is hard to recommend and players who enjoyed World of Goo are likely to be disappointed. Official Nintendo Magazine scored the Wii U version 66% but regarded the game as the fourth best Wii U game exclusive to the Nintendo eShop.Little Inferno'' was nominated for the Seumas McNally grand prize, Technical Excellence, and the Nuovo Award and received two Honorable Mentions at the Independent Games Festival.

References

External links

2012 video games
Android (operating system) games
Indie video games
IOS games
Linux games
MacOS games
Nintendo Switch games
Puzzle video games
Satirical video games
Video games developed in the United States
Wii U eShop games
Wii U games
Windows games
Independent Games Festival winners
Single-player video games